Bisig is one of the constituent barangays in the city of Valenzuela, Metro Manila, Philippines. The name "Bisig" came from an organization in the area several decades ago. And formerly named Buli

Festivals
Residents and citizens celebrate the fiesta of Sta. Cruz, their patron saint, every last Saturday of April.

Landmarks
Landmarks in Bisig includes Bisig Multipurpose Court, Tanod Building, Bisig Chapel, Bisig Day Care and Bisig Barangay.

References

External links

 Valenzuela, Philippines official site

Barangays of Metro Manila
Valenzuela, Metro Manila